Stanley Dallas (31 October 1926 – 21 November 1997) was a New Zealand recording engineer and radio technician. He was born in Glasgow, Lanarkshire, Scotland on 31 October 1926.

References

1926 births
1997 deaths
British emigrants to New Zealand
20th-century New Zealand engineers